The 2007 IIHF World U18 Championship Division II were a pair of international under-18 ice hockey tournaments run by the International Ice Hockey Federation. The Division II tournaments made up the third level of competition at the 2007 IIHF World U18 Championships. The Group A tournament took place between 15 and 21 April 2007 in Miskolc, Hungary and the Group B tournament took place between 12 and 18 March 2007 in Miercurea Ciuc, Romania. The Netherlands and Lithuania won the Group A and Group B tournaments respectively and gained promotion to Division I for the 2008 IIHF World U18 Championships. While Mexico finished last in Group A and Serbia last in Group B and were both relegated to Division III for 2008.

Group A tournament
The Group A tournament began on 15 April 2007 in Miskolc, Hungary. Belgium, Estonia, Mexico and the Netherlands returned to compete in the Division II competition after missing promotion to Division I at the previous years World Championships. Hungary entered the Division II competition after being relegated from Division I and Israel entered the tournament after gaining promotion from Division III at the 2006 IIHF World U18 Championships.

The Netherlands won the tournament after winning all five of their games and gained promotion to Division I for the 2008 IIHF World U18 Championships. Hungary finished in second place, losing only to the Netherlands and Estonia finished in third. Mexico finished in last place after losing all five of their games and were relegated to Division III for the 2008 IIHF World U18 Championships. Eden Nemenoff of Israel was named as the tournament's top goaltender by the IIHF directorate. Hungarian Daniel Koger was named the top forward and Mike Dalhuisen of the Netherlands was selected as the top defenceman. Hungary's Bálint Magosi was the tournament's leading scorer with 14 points and Miklos Rajna was the leading goaltender with a save percentage of 0.938.

Standings

Fixtures
All times local.

Scoring leaders

List shows the top ten ranked skaters sorted by points, then goals.

Leading goaltenders
Only the top five goaltenders, based on save percentage, who have played at least 40% of their team's minutes are included in this list.

Group B tournament
The Group B tournament began on 12 March 2007 in Miercurea Ciuc, Romania. Australia, Croatia and Lithuania all returned to compete in the Division II tournament after missing promotion to Division I at the previous years World Championships. Serbia made their debut appearance in the World U18 Championships after replacing the Serbia and Montenegro men's national under-18 ice hockey team, the change in team coinciding with Montenegro's declaration of independence and the eventual split of the State Union of Serbia and Montenegro. South Korea entered the Division II competition after being relegated from Division I and Romania entered the tournament after gaining promotion from Division III at the 2006 IIHF World U18 Championships.

Lithuania won the tournament after winning all five of their games and gained promotion to Division I for the 2008 IIHF World U18 Championships. South Korea finished second after losing only to Lithuania and Estonia finished in third place. Serbia finished in last place after losing all five of their games and were relegated to Division III for the 2008 IIHF World U18 Championships. Tihomir Filipec of Croatia was named as the tournament's top goaltender by the IIHF directorate. Lithuanian Povilas Verenis was named the top forward and Cho Hyung Gon of South Korea was selected as the top defenceman. Lithuania's Tadas Kumeliauskas was the tournament's leading scorer with 12 points and Arturas Kuzmicius was the leading goaltender with a save percentage of 0.948.

Standings

Fixtures
All times local.

Scoring leaders
List shows the top ten ranked skaters sorted by points, then goals.

Leading goaltenders
Only the top five goaltenders, based on save percentage, who have played at least 40% of their team's minutes are included in this list.

References

IIHF World U18 Championship Division II
IIHF World U18 Championship Division II
II
International ice hockey competitions hosted by Hungary
International ice hockey competitions hosted by Romania
IIHF World U18 Championship Division II